Tsararano may refer to:
 Tsararano, Marovoay, Madagascar
 Tsararano, Maevatanana, Madagascar
 Tsararano, Mayotte, France